The Lost Tapes – Rare Recordings 1991–2007 is a compilation album by Ooberman, released in September 2007 on the band's own Rotodisc label.

"Running in date order, most of the tracks were recovered and restored from old cassette and DAT tapes, many of which were thought to have been lost forever in a burglary. The earlier recordings chart Ooberman's pre-indie band days as home recordists when founders Dan Popplewell and Andy Flett would post cassettes and lengthy critiques back and forth between Liverpool and Birmingham. 
"Many tracks come from 1994, a big recording year for frontman Dan - he'd finished university, was on the dole with a lot of time on his hands and found himself with a bunch of new recording gear paid for by being a medical research guinea pig. Most music recorded before then was too rough for release, while the following years marked the beginnings of Ooberman's ascent to minor indie fame with most subsequent recordings therefore released on albums and B-sides."

Track listing
 Growing Old
 Loveshit Ricochet
 Time Hurts
 I Know What You're Saying
 Don't We Make A Pair
 Ride Me Home
 Blossoms Buds
 Bubbles Bursting
 Brave Men And Beautiful Women
 Drum Song Without Hat (live)
 Come What May
 Rebels For A Day
 Rosie Mel
 Heavy Duty
 Pills For Popplewell
 You're Too Beautiful

According to the press-release, track 1 is from 1991, tracks 2-8 are from 1994, 9-12 are from 1999, 13-15 are from 2000 and 16 is from 2007 (although it was featured on music website GarageBand.com in 2006). Several of the tracks have been released previously - 1, 9, 11 and 15 on "official bootlegs", 13 on the Japanese version of Carried Away, and 14 as an e-single - although the band have promised that "much has been done to clean up audio problems" in the earlier recordings.

Ooberman albums
2007 compilation albums